Little Billabong is a village community in the central part of the Riverina.  It is situated by road, about 17 kilometres west of Kyeamba and 26 kilometres east of Holbrook. At the 2006 census, Little Billabong had a population of 466 people.

Little Billabong Post Office opened on 1 October 1874 and closed in 1953.

Notes and references

External links 
 

Towns in the Riverina
Towns in New South Wales
Hume Highway